Padraic Davis is an Irish Gaelic football manager and former player. He played for the Fr Manning Gaels club and the Longford county team. He also managed the Longford county team.

Playing career
Davis played for the Fr Manning Gaels club, winning four Longford Senior Football Championships, three consecutively from 1996–98, and again in 2001.

He played for Longford for 12 years from 1995 to 2007.  He was Longford's leading forward for many years in the All-Ireland Senior Football Championship and one of the greatest players the county has ever produced. He won an O'Byrne Cup with Longford in 2000.

Davis played for Leinster in the Railway Cup (1998–2004), winning it on two occasions.

Managerial career
After retiring from playing Davis began managing at club and inter-county level. In 2010, he managed his home club St Vincent's to a Longford Minor Football Championship. That same year he was the forwards coach to the Longford minor team which won the Leinster Minor Football Championship. He was manager of the Longford under-21 team, which he led to a Leinster Final in 2011, but lost out to Wexford by a point. He was also Longford junior manager during this time and was a coach/selector with the Longford senior team in 2011, 2012 and 2013, winning Division 3 and 4 National League titles in that period.

In 2015, Davis became manager of Mohill GAA in County Leitrim. During three years at the helm, he won two Senior Championships, two U-21 Championships, as well as three consecutive Senior Leagues.

Davis took over as manager of the senior Longford footballers in September 2018. He was given a two-year extension in 2020 until the end of 2022. But he stepped down in July 2021 after Longford's heavy loss to Meath in the Leinster Championship, referring to his family, his "property market" job and the difficulties of managing at that level.

References

 http://hoganstand.com/Longford/ArticleForm.aspx?ID=45481
 http://hoganstand.com/ArticleForm.aspx?ID=144588
 https://web.archive.org/web/20120403212742/http://www.longfordleader.ie/sport/gaelic-games/padraic_davis_very_wary_of_wexford_1_2548119
 http://www.padraicdavis.ie/

Year of birth missing (living people)
Living people
Fr Manning Gaels Gaelic footballers
Gaelic football managers
Leinster inter-provincial Gaelic footballers
Longford inter-county Gaelic footballers